Prague is the capital and largest city in the Czech Republic, and the historical capital of Bohemia. On the Vltava river, Prague is home to about 1.3 million people. The city has a temperate oceanic climate, with relatively warm summers and chilly winters.

Prague is a political, cultural, and economic hub of central Europe, with a rich history and Romanesque, Gothic, Renaissance and Baroque architectures. It was the capital of the Kingdom of Bohemia and residence of several Holy Roman Emperors, most notably Charles IV (r. 1346–1378).

It was an important city to the Habsburg monarchy and Austro-Hungarian Empire. The city played major roles in the Bohemian and the Protestant Reformations, the Thirty Years' War and in 20th-century history as the capital of Czechoslovakia between the World Wars and the post-war Communist era.

Prague is home to a number of well-known cultural attractions, many of which survived the violence and destruction of 20th-century Europe. Main attractions include Prague Castle, Charles Bridge, Old Town Square with the Prague astronomical clock, the Jewish Quarter, Petřín hill and Vyšehrad. Since 1992, the historic center of Prague has been included in the UNESCO list of World Heritage Sites.

The city has more than ten major museums, along with numerous theaters, galleries, cinemas, and other historical exhibits. An extensive modern public transportation system connects the city. It is home to a wide range of public and private schools, including Charles University in Prague, the oldest university in Central Europe.

Prague is classified as an "Alpha-" global city according to GaWC studies. In 2019, the city was ranked as 69th most livable city in the world by Mercer. In the same year, the PICSA Index ranked the city as 13th most livable city in the world. Its rich history makes it a popular tourist destination and as of 2017, the city receives more than 8.5 million international visitors annually. In 2017, Prague was listed as the fifth most visited European city after London, Paris, Rome, and Istanbul.

Etymology and names

The Czech name Praha is derived from an old Slavic word, práh, which means "ford" or "rapid", referring to the city's origin at a crossing point of the Vltava river. The same etymology is associated with the Praga district of Warsaw.

Another view to the origin of the name is also related to the Czech word práh (with the meaning of a threshold) and a legendary etymology connects the name of the city with princess Libuše, prophetess and a wife of mythical founder of the Přemyslid dynasty. She is said to have ordered the city "to be built where a man hews a threshold of his house". The Czech práh might thus be understood to refer to rapids or fords in the river, the edge of which could have acted as a means of fording the river – thus providing a "threshold" to the castle.

Another derivation of the name Praha is suggested from na prazě, the original term for the shale hillside rock upon which the original castle was built. At that time, the castle was surrounded by forests, covering the nine hills of the future city – the Old Town on the opposite side of the river, as well as the Lesser Town beneath the existing castle, appeared only later.

The English spelling of the city's name is borrowed from French. In the 19th and early 20th centuries it was pronounced in English to rhyme with "vague": it was so pronounced by Lady Diana Cooper (born 1892) on Desert Island Discs in 1969, and it is written to rhyme with "vague" in a verse of The Beleaguered City by Longfellow (1839) and also in the limerick There was an Old Lady of Prague by Edward Lear (1846).

Prague is also called the "City of a Hundred Spires", based on a count by 19th century mathematician Bernard Bolzano; today's count is estimated by the Prague Information Service at 500. Nicknames for Prague have also included: the Golden City, the Mother of Cities and the Heart of Europe.

History

During the thousand years of its existence, Prague grew from a settlement stretching from Prague Castle in the north to the fort of Vyšehrad in the south, to become the capital of a modern European country.

Early history

The region was settled as early as the Paleolithic age. Jewish chronicler David Solomon Ganz, citing Cyriacus Spangenberg, claimed that the city was founded as Boihaem in c. 1306 BC by an ancient king, Boyya.

Around the fifth and fourth century BC, a Celtic tribe appeared in the area, later establishing settlements, including the largest Celtic oppidum in Bohemia, Závist, in a present-day south suburb Zbraslav in Prague, and naming the region of Bohemia, which means "home of the Boii people". In the last century BC, the Celts were slowly driven away by Germanic tribes (Marcomanni, Quadi, Lombards and possibly the Suebi), leading some to place the seat of the Marcomanni king, Maroboduus, in Závist. Around the area where present-day Prague stands, the 2nd century map drawn by Ptolemaios mentioned a Germanic city called Casurgis.

In the late 5th century AD, during the great Migration Period following the collapse of the Western Roman Empire, the Germanic tribes living in Bohemia moved westwards and, probably in the 6th century, the Slavic tribes (Venedi) settled the Central Bohemian Region. In the following three centuries, the Czech tribes built several fortified settlements in the area, most notably in the Šárka valley, Butovice and Levý Hradec.

The construction of what came to be known as Prague Castle began near the end of the 9th century, expanding a fortified settlement that had existed on the site since the year 800. The first masonry under Prague Castle dates from the year 885 at the latest. The other prominent Prague fort, the Přemyslid fort Vyšehrad, was founded in the 10th century, some 70 years later than Prague Castle. Prague Castle is dominated by the cathedral, which began construction in 1344, but wasn't completed until the 20th century.

The legendary origins of Prague attribute its foundation to the 8th-century Czech duchess and prophetess Libuše and her husband, Přemysl, founder of the Přemyslid dynasty. Legend says that Libuše came out on a rocky cliff high above the Vltava and prophesied: "I see a great city whose glory will touch the stars." She ordered a castle and a town called Praha to be built on the site.

The region became the seat of the dukes, and later kings of Bohemia. Under Duke of Bohemia Boleslaus II the Pious the area became a bishopric in 973. Until Prague was elevated to archbishopric in 1344, it was under the jurisdiction of the Archbishopric of Mainz.

Prague was an important seat for trading where merchants from across Europe settled, including many Jews, as recalled in 965 by the Hispano-Jewish merchant and traveler Abraham ben Jacob. The Old New Synagogue of 1270 still stands in the city. Prague was also once home to an important slave market.

At the site of the ford in the Vltava river, King Vladislaus I had the first bridge built in 1170, the Judith Bridge (Juditin most), named in honor of his wife Judith of Thuringia. This bridge was destroyed by a flood in 1342, but some of the original foundation stones of that bridge remain in the river. It was rebuilt and named the Charles Bridge.

In 1257, under King Ottokar II, Malá Strana ("Lesser Quarter") was founded in Prague on the site of an older village in what would become the Hradčany (Prague Castle) area. This was the district of the German people, who had the right to administer the law autonomously, pursuant to Magdeburg rights. The new district was on the bank opposite of the Staré Město ("Old Town"), which had borough status and was bordered by a line of walls and fortifications.

Late Middle Ages

Prague flourished during the 14th-century reign (1346–1378) of Charles IV, Holy Roman Emperor and the king of Bohemia of the new Luxembourg dynasty. As King of Bohemia and Holy Roman Emperor, he transformed Prague into an imperial capital. In the 1470s, Prague had around 70,000 inhabitants and with an area of 360 ha (~1.4 square miles) it was the third-largest city in the Holy Roman Empire.

Charles IV ordered the building of the New Town (Nové Město) adjacent to the Old Town and laid out the design himself. The Charles Bridge, replacing the Judith Bridge destroyed in the flood just prior to his reign, was erected to connect the east bank districts to the Malá Strana and castle area. In 1347, he founded Charles University, which remains the oldest university in Central Europe.

He began construction of the Gothic Saint Vitus Cathedral, within the largest of the Prague Castle courtyards, on the site of the Romanesque rotunda there. Prague was elevated to an archbishopric in 1344, the year the cathedral was begun.

The city had a mint and was a center of trade for German and Italian bankers and merchants. The social order, however, became more turbulent due to the rising power of the craftsmen's guilds (themselves often torn by internal conflicts), and the increasing number of poor.

The Hunger Wall, a substantial fortification wall south of Malá Strana and the castle area, was built during a famine in the 1360s. The work is reputed to have been ordered by Charles IV as a means of providing employment and food to the workers and their families.

Charles IV died in 1378. During the reign of his son, King Wenceslaus IV (1378–1419), a period of intense turmoil ensued. During Easter 1389, members of the Prague clergy announced that Jews had desecrated the host (Eucharistic wafer) and the clergy encouraged mobs to pillage, ransack and burn the Jewish quarter. Nearly the entire Jewish population of Prague (3,000 people) was murdered.

In 1400, Prague had 95,000 inhabitants, making it the third largest city in Europe (after Paris and Venice). Jan Hus, a theologian and rector at the Charles University, preached in Prague. In 1402, he began giving sermons in the Bethlehem Chapel. Inspired by John Wycliffe, these sermons focused on what were seen as radical reforms of a corrupt Church. Having become too dangerous for the political and religious establishment, Hus was summoned to the Council of Constance, put on trial for heresy, and burned at the stake in Constanz in 1415.

Four years later Prague experienced its first defenestration, when the people rebelled under the command of the Prague priest Jan Želivský. Hus' death, coupled with Czech proto-nationalism and proto-Protestantism, had spurred the Hussite Wars. Peasant rebels, led by the general Jan Žižka, along with Hussite troops from Prague, defeated Emperor Sigismund, in the Battle of Vítkov Hill in 1420.

During the Hussite Wars when Prague was attacked by "Crusader" and mercenary forces, the city militia fought bravely under the Prague Banner. The words "PÁN BŮH POMOC NAŠE" (The Lord is our Relief/Help) appeared above the coat-of-arms, with a Hussite chalice centered on the top. Near the swallow-tails is a crescent-shaped golden sun with rays protruding.

One of these banners was captured by Swedish troops during the Battle of Prague (1648), when they captured the western bank of the Vltava river and were repulsed from the eastern bank, they placed it in the Royal Military Museum in Stockholm; although this flag still exists, it is in very poor condition. They also took the Codex Gigas and the Codex Argenteus. The earliest evidence indicates that a gonfalon with a municipal charge painted on it was used for the Old Town as early as 1419. Since this city militia flag was in use before 1477 and during the Hussite Wars, it is the oldest still preserved municipal flag of Bohemia.

In the following two centuries, Prague strengthened its role as a merchant city. Many noteworthy Gothic buildings were erected and Vladislav Hall of the Prague Castle was added.

Habsburg era

In 1526, the Bohemian estates elected Ferdinand I of the House of Habsburg. The fervent Catholicism of its members brought them into conflict in Bohemia, and then in Prague, where Protestant ideas were gaining popularity. These problems were not preeminent under Holy Roman Emperor Rudolf II, elected King of Bohemia in 1576, who chose Prague as his home. He lived in the Prague Castle, where his court welcomed not only astrologers and magicians but also scientists, musicians, and artists. Rudolf was an art lover as well, and Prague became the capital of European culture. This was a prosperous period for the city: famous people living there in that age include the astronomers Tycho Brahe and Johannes Kepler, the painter Arcimboldo, the alchemists Edward Kelley and John Dee, the poet Elizabeth Jane Weston, and others.

In 1618, the famous second defenestration of Prague provoked the Thirty Years' War, a particularly harsh period for Prague and Bohemia. Ferdinand II of Habsburg was deposed, and his place as King of Bohemia taken by Frederick V, Elector Palatine; however his army was crushed in the Battle of White Mountain (1620) not far from the city. Following this in 1621 was an execution of 27 Czech Protestant leaders (involved in the uprising) in Old Town Square and the exiling of many others. Prague was forcibly converted back to Roman Catholicism followed by the rest of Czech lands. The city suffered subsequently during the war under an attack by Electorate of Saxony (1631) and during the Battle of Prague (1648). Prague began a steady decline which reduced the population from the 60,000 it had had in the years before the war to 20,000. In the second half of the 17th century, Prague's population began to grow again. Jews had been in Prague since the end of the 10th century and, by 1708, they accounted for about a quarter of Prague's population.

In 1689, a great fire devastated Prague, but this spurred a renovation and a rebuilding of the city. In 1713–14, a major outbreak of plague hit Prague one last time, killing 12,000 to 13,000 people.

In 1744, Frederick the Great of Prussia invaded Bohemia. He took Prague after a severe and prolonged siege in the course of which a large part of the town was destroyed. In 1757 the Prussian bombardment destroyed more than one quarter of the city and heavily damaged St. Vitus Cathedral. However a month later, Frederick the Great was defeated and forced to retreat from Bohemia.

The economy of Prague continued to improve during the 18th century. The population increased to 80,000 inhabitants by 1771. Many rich merchants and nobles enhanced the city with a host of palaces, churches and gardens full of art and music, creating a Baroque city renowned throughout the world to this day.

In 1784, under Joseph II, the four municipalities of Malá Strana, Nové Město, Staré Město, and Hradčany were merged into a single entity. The Jewish district, called Josefov, was included only in 1850. The Industrial Revolution produced great changes and developments in Prague, as new factories could take advantage of the coal mines and ironworks of the nearby regions. A first suburb, Karlín, was created in 1817, and twenty years later the population exceeded 100,000.

The revolutions in Europe in 1848 also touched Prague, but they were fiercely suppressed. In the following years, the Czech National Revival began its rise, until it gained the majority in the town council in 1861. Prague had a German-speaking majority in 1848, but by 1880 the number of German speakers had decreased to 14% (42,000), and by 1910 to 6.7% (37,000), due to a massive increase of the city's overall population caused by the influx of Czechs from the rest of Bohemia and Moravia and the increasing prestige and importance of the Czech language as part of the Czech National Revival.

20th century

First Czechoslovak Republic

World War I ended with the defeat of the Austro-Hungarian Empire and the creation of Czechoslovakia. Prague was chosen as its capital and Prague Castle as the seat of president Tomáš Garrigue Masaryk. At this time Prague was a true European capital with highly developed industry. By 1930, the population had risen to 850,000.

Second World War

Hitler ordered the German Army to enter Prague on 15 March 1939, and from Prague Castle proclaimed Bohemia and Moravia a German protectorate. For most of its history, Prague had been a multi-ethnic city with important Czech, German and (mostly native German-speaking) Jewish populations. From 1939, when the country was occupied by Nazi Germany, Hitler took over Prague Castle. During the Second World War, most Jews were deported and killed by the Germans. In 1942, Prague was witness to the assassination of one of the most powerful men in Nazi Germany—Reinhard Heydrich—during Operation Anthropoid, accomplished by Czechoslovak national heroes Jozef Gabčík and Jan Kubiš. Hitler ordered bloody reprisals.

In February 1945, Prague suffered several bombing raids by the US Army Air Forces. 701 people were killed, more than 1,000 people were injured and some buildings, factories and historical landmarks (Emmaus Monastery, Faust House, Vinohrady Synagogue) were destroyed. Many historic structures in Prague, however, escaped the destruction of the war and the damage was small compared to the total destruction of many other cities in that time. According to American pilots, it was the result of a navigational mistake. In March, a deliberate raid targeted military factories in Prague, killing about 370 people.

On 5 May 1945, two days before Germany capitulated, an uprising against Germany occurred. Several thousand Czechs were killed in four days of bloody street fighting, with many atrocities committed by both sides. The majority (about 50,000 people) of the German population of Prague either fled or were expelled by the Beneš decrees in the aftermath of the war.

Cold War

Prague was a city in a country under the military, economic, and political control of the Soviet Union (see Iron Curtain and COMECON). The world's largest Stalin Monument was unveiled on Letná hill in 1955 and destroyed in 1962. 
The 4th Czechoslovak Writers' Congress, held in the city in June 1967, took a strong position against the regime. On 31 October 1967 students demonstrated at Strahov. This spurred the new secretary of the Czechoslovak Communist Party, Alexander Dubček, to proclaim a new deal in his city's and country's life, starting the short-lived season of the "socialism with a human face". It was the Prague Spring, which aimed at the renovation of political institutions in a democratic way. The other Warsaw Pact member countries, except Romania and Albania, were led by the Soviet Union to repress these reforms through the invasion of Czechoslovakia and the capital, Prague, on 21 August 1968. The invasion, chiefly by infantry and tanks, effectively suppressed any further attempts at reform. The military occupation of Czechoslovakia by the Red Army would end only in 1991.
Jan Palach and Jan Zajíc committed suicide by self-immolation in January and February 1969 to protest against the "normalization" of the country.

After the Velvet Revolution

In 1989, after riot police beat back a peaceful student demonstration, the Velvet Revolution crowded the streets of Prague, and the capital of Czechoslovakia benefited greatly from the new mood. In 1993, after the Velvet Divorce, Prague became the capital city of the new Czech Republic. From 1995 high-rise buildings began to be built in Prague in large quantities. In the late 1990s, Prague again became an important cultural center of Europe and was notably influenced by globalisation. In 2000, the IMF and World Bank summits took place in Prague and anti-globalization riots took place here. In 2002, Prague suffered from widespread floods that damaged buildings and its underground transport system.

Prague launched a bid for the 2016 Summer Olympics, but failed to make the candidate city shortlist. In June 2009, as the result of financial pressures from the global recession, Prague's officials chose to cancel the city's planned bid for the 2020 Summer Olympics.

Geography
Prague is situated on the Vltava river. The Berounka flows into the Vltava in the suburbs of Lahovice. The longest streams are Rokytka and Botič.

There are 3 reservoirs, 37 ponds, and 34 retention reservoirs and dry polders in the city.

In terms of geomorphological division, most of Prague is located in the Prague Plateau. In the south the city's territory extends into the Hořovice Uplands, in the north it extends into the Central Elbe Table lowland.

Prague is approximately at the same latitude as Frankfurt, Germany; Paris, France; and Vancouver, Canada.

Climate

Prague has an oceanic climate (Köppen: Cfb) with humid continental (Dfb) influences, defined as such by the  isotherm. The winters are relatively cold with average temperatures at about freezing point, and with very little sunshine. There are also a few periods of mild temperatures in winter. Nights can be quite cool even in summer, though. The driest season is usually winter while late spring and summer can bring quite heavy rain, especially in form of thundershowers. Temperature inversions are relatively common between mid-October and mid-March bringing foggy, cold days and sometimes moderate air pollution. Prague is also a windy city with common sustained western winds and an average wind speed of  that often help break temperature inversions and clear the air in cold months.

Administration

Administrative division

Prague is the capital of the Czech Republic and as such is the regular seat of its central authorities. Since 24 November 1990, it is de facto again a statutory city, but has a specific status of the municipality and the region at the same time. Prague also houses the administrative institutions of the Central Bohemian Region.

Until 1949, all administrative districts of Prague were formed by the whole one or more cadastral unit, municipality or town. Since 1949, there has been a fundamental change in the administrative division. Since then, the boundaries of many urban districts, administrative districts and city districts are independent of the boundaries of cadastral territories and some cadastral territories are thus divided into administrative and self-governing parts of the city. Cadastral area (for example, Vinohrady, Smíchov) are still relevant especially for the registration of land and real estate and house numbering.

Prague is divided into 10 municipal districts (1–10), 22 administrative districts (1–22), 57 municipal parts, and 112 cadastral areas.

City government
Prague is autonomously administered by the Prague City Assembly, which is elected through municipal elections and consists of 65 members. Executive body of Prague, elected by the Assembly is a Prague City Council. The municipal office of Prague is called Prague City Hall. It has 11 members including the mayor and it prepares proposals for the Assembly meetings and ensures that adopted resolutions are fulfilled. The Mayor of Prague is Civic Democratic Party member Bohuslav Svoboda.

Demographics

2011 census
Even though the official population of Prague hovers around 1.3 million as of the 2011 census, the city's real population is much higher due to only 65% of its residents being marked as permanently living in the city. Data taken from mobile phone movements around the city suggest that the real population of Prague is closer to 1.9 or 2.0 million, with an additional 300,000 to 400,000 commuters coming to the city on weekdays for work, education, or commerce.

About 14% of the city’s inhabitants were born outside the Czech Republic, the highest proportion in the country. However, 64.8% of the city's population self-identified as ethnically Czech, which is slightly higher than the national average of 63.7%. Almost 29% of respondents declined to answer the question on ethnicity at all, so it may be assumed that the real percentage of ethnic Czechs in Prague is considerably higher. The largest ethnic minority are Slovaks, followed by Ukrainians and Russians.

Prague's population is the oldest and best-educated in the country. It has the lowest proportion of children. Only 10.8% of census respondents claimed adherence to a religion; the majority of these were Roman Catholics.

Historical population
Development of the Prague population since 1378:

Culture

The city is traditionally one of the cultural centres of Europe, hosting many cultural events. Some of the significant cultural institutions include the National Theatre (Národní Divadlo) and the Estates Theatre (Stavovské or Tylovo or Nosticovo divadlo), where the premières of Mozart's Don Giovanni and La clemenza di Tito were held. Other major cultural institutions are the Rudolfinum which is home to the Czech Philharmonic Orchestra and the Municipal House which is home to the Prague Symphony Orchestra. The Prague State Opera (Státní opera) performs at the Smetana Theatre.

The city has many world-class museums, including the National Museum (Národní muzeum), the Museum of the Capital City of Prague, the Jewish Museum in Prague, the Alfons Mucha Museum, the African-Prague Museum, the Museum of Decorative Arts in Prague, the Náprstek Museum (Náprstkovo Muzeum), the Josef Sudek Gallery and The Josef Sudek Studio, the National Library, the National Gallery, which manages the largest collection of art in the Czech Republic and the Kunsthalle Praha, the newest museum in the city.

There are hundreds of concert halls, galleries, cinemas and music clubs in the city. It hosts music festivals including the Prague Spring International Music Festival, the Prague Autumn International Music Festival, the Prague International Organ Festival, the Dvořák Prague International Music Festival, and the Prague International Jazz Festival. Film festivals include the Febiofest, the One World Film Festival and Echoes of the Karlovy Vary International Film Festival. The city also hosts the Prague Writers' Festival, the Prague Folklore Days, Prague Advent Choral Meeting the Summer Shakespeare Festival, the Prague Fringe Festival, the World Roma Festival, as well as the hundreds of Vernissages and fashion shows.

An early the 1912 silent drama film Pro peníze was filmed mostly in Prague. Many films have been made at Barrandov Studios and at Prague Studios. Hollywood films set in Prague include Mission Impossible, xXx, Blade II, Children of Dune, Alien vs. Predator, Doom, Chronicles of Narnia, Hellboy, EuroTrip, Van Helsing, Red Tails, and Spider-Man: Far From Home. Other Czech films shot in Prague include Empties, Amadeus and The Fifth Horseman is Fear. Also, the romantic music video "Never Tear Us Apart" by INXS, "Diamonds from Sierra Leone" by Kanye West was shot in the city, and features shots of the Charles Bridge and the Astronomical Clock, among other landmarks. Rihanna's "Don't Stop the Music" video was filmed at Prague's Radost FX Club. The city was also the setting for the film Dungeons and Dragons in 2000. The music video "Silver and Cold" by AFI, an American rock band, was also filmed in Prague. Many Indian films have also been filmed in the city including Yuvraaj, Drona and Rockstar. Early 2000s europop hit "Something" by "Lasgo" was filmed at the central train station in Prague.

Video games set in Prague include Tomb Raider: The Angel of Darkness, Indiana Jones and the Emperor's Tomb, Vampire: The Masquerade – Redemption, Soldier of Fortune II: Double Helix, Broken Sword: The Sleeping Dragon, Still Life, Call of Duty: Modern Warfare 3 and Deus Ex: Mankind Divided.

With the growth of low-cost airlines in Europe, Prague has become a weekend city destination allowing tourists to visit its museums and cultural sites as well as try its Czech beers and cuisine.

The city has many buildings by renowned architects, including Adolf Loos (Villa Müller), Frank O. Gehry (Dancing House) and Jean Nouvel (Golden Angel).

Recent major events held in Prague:

International Monetary Fund and World Bank Summit 2000
NATO Summit 2002
International Olympic Committee Session 2004
IAU General Assembly 2006 (Definition of planet)
EU & USA Summit 2009
Czech Presidency of the Council of the European Union 2009
USA & Russia Summit 2010 (signing of the New START treaty)

Cuisine

In 2008, the Allegro restaurant received the first Michelin star in the whole of the post-Communist part of Central Europe. It retained its star until 2011. , there were just two Michelin-starred restaurants in Prague: La Degustation Bohême Bourgeoise and Field. Another six have been awarded Michelin's Bib Gourmand: Bistrøt 104, Divinis, Eska, Maso a Kobliha, Na Kopci and Sansho. However, as of 2022, there are 27 Michelin-starred restaurants in Prague which still include La Degustation Bohême Bourgeoise and Field.

In Malá Strana, Staré Město, Žižkov and Nusle there are hundreds of restaurants, bars and pubs, especially with Czech beer. Prague also hosts the Czech Beer Festival (Český pivní festival), which is the largest beer festival in the Czech Republic held for 17 days every year in May. At the festival, more than 70 brands of Czech beer can be tasted. There are several microbrewery festivals throughout the year as well.

Czech beer has a long history, with brewing taking place in Břevnov Monastery in 993. Prague is home to historical breweries Staropramen (Praha 5), U Fleků, U Medvídků, U Tří růží, Strahov Monastery Brewery (Praha 1) and Břevnov Monastery Brewery (Praha 6). Among many microbreweries are: Novoměstský, Pražský most u Valšů, Národní, Boršov, Loď pivovar, U Dobřenských, U Dvou koček, U Supa (Praha 1), Pivovarský dům (Praha 2), Sousedský pivovar Bašta (Praha 4), Suchdolský Jeník, Libocký pivovar (Praha 6), Marina (Praha 7), U Bulovky (Praha 8), Beznoska, Kolčavka (Praha 9), Vinohradský pivovar, Zubatý pes, Malešický mikropivovar (Praha 10), Jihoměstský pivovar (Praha 11), Lužiny (Praha 13), Počernický pivovar (Praha 14) and Hostivar (Praha 15).

Economy

Prague's economy accounts for 25% of the Czech GDP making it the highest performing regional economy of the country. As of 2021, its GDP per capita in purchasing power standard is €58,216, making it the third best performing region in the EU at 203 per cent of the EU-27 average in 2021.

Prague employs almost a fifth of the entire Czech workforce, and its wages are significantly above average (≈+20%). In 4Q/2020, during the pandemic, average salaries available in Prague reached CZK 45.944 (≈€1,800) per month, an annual increase of 4%, which was nevertheless lower than national increase of 6.5% both in nominal and real terms. (Inflation in the Czech Republic was 3.2% in 4Q/2020.) Since 1990, the city's economic structure has shifted from industrial to service-oriented. Industry is present in sectors such as pharmaceuticals, printing, food processing, manufacture of transport equipment, computer technology, and electrical engineering. In the service sector, financial and commercial services, trade, restaurants, hospitality and public administration are the most significant. Services account for around 80 per cent of employment. There are 800,000 employees in Prague, including 120,000 commuters. The number of (legally registered) foreign residents in Prague has been increasing in spite of the country's economic downturn. As of March 2010, 148,035 foreign workers were reported to be living in the city making up about 18 per cent of the workforce, up from 131,132 in 2008. Approximately one-fifth of all investment in the Czech Republic takes place in the city.

Almost one-half of the national income from tourism is spent in Prague. The city offers approximately 73,000 beds in accommodation facilities, most of which were built after 1990, including almost 51,000 beds in hotels and boarding houses.

From the late 1990s to late 2000s, the city was a common filming location for international productions such as Hollywood and Bollywood motion pictures. A combination of architecture, low costs and the existing motion picture infrastructure have proven attractive to international film production companies.

The modern economy of Prague is largely service and export-based and, in a 2010 survey, the city was named the best city in Central and Eastern Europe (CEE) for business.

In 2005, Prague was deemed among the three best cities in Central and Eastern Europe according to The Economists livability rankings. The city was named as a top-tier nexus city for innovation across multiple sectors of the global innovation economy, placing 29th globally out of 289 cities, ahead of Brussels and Helsinki for innovation in 2010 in 2thinknow annual analysts Innovation Cities Index.

Na příkopě is the most expensive street among all the states of the V4. In 2017, with the amount of rent €2,640 (CZK 67,480) per square meter per year, ranked on 22nd place among the most expensive streets in the world. The second most expensive is Pařížská street.

In the Eurostat research, Prague ranked fifth among Europe's 271 regions in terms of gross domestic product per inhabitant, achieving 172 per cent of the EU average. It ranked just above Paris and well above the country as a whole, which achieved 80 per cent of the EU average.

Companies with highest turnover in the region in 2014:

Prague is also the site of some of the most important offices and institutions of the Czech Republic

President of the Czech Republic
The Government and both houses of Parliament
Ministries and other national offices (Industrial Property Office, Czech Statistical Office, National Security Authority etc.)
Czech National Bank
Czech Television and other major broadcasters
Radio Free Europe – Radio Liberty
Galileo global navigation project
Academy of Sciences of the Czech Republic

Tourism

Since the fall of the Iron Curtain, Prague has become one of the world's most popular tourist destinations. Prague suffered considerably less damage during World War II than some other major cities in the region, allowing most of its historic architecture to stay true to form. It contains one of the world's most pristine and varied collections of architecture, from Romanesque, to Gothic, Renaissance, Baroque, Rococo, Neo-Renaissance, Neo-Gothic, Art Nouveau, Cubist, Neo-Classical and ultra-modern.

Prague is classified as an "Alpha-" global city according to GaWC studies, comparable to Vienna, Manila and Washington, D.C. Prague ranked sixth in the Tripadvisor world list of best destinations in 2016. Its rich history makes it a popular tourist destination, and the city receives more than 8.4 million international visitors annually, .

Main attractions
Hradčany and Lesser Town (Malá Strana)

Prague Castle with the St. Vitus Cathedral which stores the Czech Crown Jewels
The picturesque Charles Bridge (Karlův most)
The Baroque Saint Nicholas Church
Church of Our Lady Victorious and Infant Jesus of Prague
Písek Gate, one of the last preserved city gate of Baroque fortification
Petřín Hill with Petřín Lookout Tower, Mirror Maze and Petřín funicular
Lennon Wall
The Franz Kafka Museum
Kampa Island, an island with a view of the Charles Bridge
The Baroque Wallenstein Palace with its garden

Old Town (Staré Město) and Josefov

The Astronomical Clock (Orloj) on Old Town City Hall
The Gothic Church of Our Lady before Týn (Kostel Matky Boží před Týnem) from the 14th century with 80 m high towers
Stone Bell House
The vaulted Gothic Old New Synagogue (Staronová Synagoga) of 1270
Old Jewish Cemetery
Powder Tower (Prašná brána), a Gothic tower of the old city gates
Spanish Synagogue with its elaborate interior decoration
Old Town Square (Staroměstské náměstí) with gothic and baroque architectural styles
The art nouveau Municipal House, a major civic landmark and concert hall known for its Art Nouveau architectural style and political history in the Czech Republic.
Museum of Decorative Arts in Prague, with an extensive collections including glass, furniture, textile, toys, Art Nouveau, Cubism and Art Deco
Clam-Gallas Palace, a baroque palace from 1713
Church of St. Martin in the Wall
Colloredo-Mansfeld Palace, with elements of High Baroque and the later Rococo and Second-Rococo adaptations. Known today for its well-preserved dance hall 
St. Clement's Cathedral, Prague

New Town (Nové Město)

Busy and historic Wenceslas Square
The neo-renaissance National Museum with large scientific and historical collections at the head of Wenceslas Square. It is the largest museum in the Czech Republic, covering disciplines from the natural sciences to specialized areas of the social sciences. The staircase of the building offers a nice view of the New Town.
The National Theatre, a neo-Renaissance building with golden roof, alongside the banks of the Vltava river
The deconstructivist Dancing House (Fred and Ginger Building)
Charles Square, the largest medieval square in Europe (now turned into a park)
The Emmaus monastery and  "Prague to Its Victorious Sons" at Palacky Square (Palackého náměstí)
The museum of the Heydrich assassination in the crypt of the Church of Saints Cyril and Methodius
Stiassny's Jubilee Synagogue is the largest in Prague
The Mucha Museum, showcasing the Art Nouveau works of Alphonse Mucha
Church of St. Apollinaire, Prague
Church of Saint Michael the Archangel in Prague
Church of the Assumption of the Virgin Mary and St. Charles the Great, Prague
Church of Our Lady on the Lawn
St. Wenceslas Church (Zderaz)
St. Stephen's Church

Vinohrady and Žižkov

National Monument in Vitkov with a large bronze equestrian statue of Jan Žižka in Vítkov Park, Žižkov – Prague 3
The neo-Gothic Church of St. Ludmila at Míru Square in Vinohrady
Žižkov Television Tower 
New Jewish Cemetery in Olšany, location of Franz Kafka's grave – Prague 3
The Roman Catholic Sacred Heart Church at Jiřího z Poděbrad Square
The Vinohrady grand Neo-Renaissance, Art Nouveau, Pseudo Baroque, and Neo-Gothic buildings in the area between Míru Square, Jiřího z Poděbrad Square and Havlíčkovy sady park

Other places

Vyšehrad Castle with Basilica of St Peter and St Paul, Vyšehrad cemetery and Prague oldest Rotunda of St. Martin
The Prague Metronome at Letná Park, a giant, functional metronome that looms over the city
Prague Zoo in Troja, selected as the 7th best zoo in the world by Forbes magazine in 2007 and the 4th best by TripAdvisor in 2015
Industrial Palace (Průmyslový palác), Křižík's Light fountain, funfair Lunapark and Sea World Aquarium in Výstaviště compound in Holešovice
Letohrádek Hvězda (Star Villa) in Liboc, a renaissance villa in the shape of a six-pointed star surrounded by a game reserve
National Gallery in Prague with large collection of Czech and international paintings and sculptures by artists such as Mucha, Kupka, Picasso, Monet and Van Gogh
Opera performances in National Theatre – unlike drama, all opera performances run with English subtitles.
Anděl, a busy part of the city with modern architecture and a shopping mall
The large Nusle Bridge, spans the Nusle Valley, linking New Town to Pankrác, with the Metro running underneath the road
Strahov Monastery, an old Czech premonstratensian abbey founded in 1149 and monastic library
Hotel International Prague, a four-star hotel and Czech cultural monument

Tourism statistics

Education

Nine public universities and thirty six private universities are located in the city, including:

Public universities

Charles University (UK) founded in 1348, the oldest university in Central Europe
Czech Technical University (ČVUT) founded in 1707
University of Chemistry and Technology (VŠCHT) founded in 1920
University of Economics (VŠE) founded in 1953
Czech University of Life Sciences Prague (ČZU) founded in 1906/1952
Czech Police Academy (PA ČR) founded in 1993

Public arts academies

Academy of Fine Arts (AVU) founded in 1800
Academy of Arts, Architecture and Design (VŠUP) founded in 1885
Academy of Performing Arts (AMU) founded in 1945

Private universities
 (UJAK) founded in 2001
Metropolitan University Prague (MUP) founded in 2001
The University of Finance and Administration (VSFS) founded in 1999

Largest private colleges

University College of Business in Prague (VŠO) founded in 2000
 (VŠEM) founded in 2001
 (VŠPP) founded in 2000
 (VŠH) founded in 1999
College of International and Public Relations Prague (VŠMVV) founded in 2001
CEVRO Institute (CEVRO) founded in 2005
Ambis College (AMBIS) founded in 1994
 (Vysoká škola zdravotnická) founded in 2005
Anglo-American University (AAVŠ) founded in 2000
University of New York in Prague (UNYP) founded in 1998

International institutions

Instituto Camões
Goethe-Institut
Instituto Cervantes
British Council
Alliance Française and Institut Français
Istituto Italiano di Cultura
Adam Mickiewicz Institute and Polish Institute

Science, research and hi-tech centres

The region city of Prague is an important centre of research. It is the seat of 39 out of 54 institutes of the Czech Academy of Sciences, including the largest ones, the Institute of Physics, the Institute of Microbiology and the Institute of Organic Chemistry and Biochemistry. It is also a seat of 10 public research institutes, four business incubators and large hospitals performing research and development activities such as the Motol University Hospital or Institute for Clinical and Experimental Medicine, which was the largest transplant center in Europe as of 2019. Universities seated in Prague (see section Colleges and Universities) also represent important centres of science and research activities.

, there were 13,000 researchers (out of 30,000 in the country, counted in full-time equivalents), representing a 3% share of Prague's economically active population. Gross expenditure on research and development accounted for €901.3 million (41.5% of country's total).

Some well-known multinational companies have established research and development facilities in Prague, among them Siemens, Honeywell, Oracle, Microsoft and Broadcom.

Prague was selected to host administration of the EU satellite navigation system Galileo. It started to provide its first services in December 2016 and full completion is expected by 2020.

Transport
, Prague's transport modal share by journey was 52% public transport, 24.5% by car, 22.4% on foot, 0.4% by bike and 0.5% by aeroplane.

Public transportation

Prague has one of the highest rates of public transport usage in the world, with 1.2 billion passenger journeys per year. Prague has about 300 bus lines (numbers 100–960) and 34 regular tram lines (numbers 1–26 and 91–99). There are also three funiculars, one on Petřín Hill, one on Mrázovka Hill and a third at the Zoo in Troja.

The Prague tram system now operates various types of trams, including the Tatra T3, newer Tatra KT8D5, Škoda 14 T (designed by Porsche), newer modern Škoda 15 T and nostalgic tram lines 23 and 41. Around 400 vehicles are the modernized T3 class, which are typically operated coupled together in pairs.

The Prague tram system is the twelfth longest in the world (142 km) and its rolling stock consists of 857 individual cars, which is the third largest in the world behind Moscow and Budapest. The system carries more than 360 million passengers annually, the highest tram patronage in the world after Budapest, on a per capita basis, Prague has the second highest tram patronage after Zürich.

All services (metro, tramways, city buses, funiculars and ferries) have a common ticketing system that operates on a proof-of-payment system. Basic transfer tickets can be bought for 30 and 90-minute rides, short-term tourist passes are available for periods of 24 hours or 3 days, and longer-term tickets can be bought on the smart ticketing system Lítačka, for periods of one month, three months or one year.

Services are run by the Prague Public Transport Company (Dopravní podnik hl. m. Prahy, a. s.) and several other companies. Since 2005 the Regional Organiser of Prague Integrated Transport (ROPID) has franchised operation of ferries on the Vltava river, which are also a part of the public transport system with common fares. Taxi services make pick-ups on the streets or operate from regulated taxi stands.

Prague Metro

The Metro has three major lines extending throughout the city: A (green), B (yellow) and C (red). A fourth Metro line D is under construction, which will connect the city centre to southern parts of the city (as of 2022, the completion is expected in 2028). The Prague Metro system served 589.2 million passengers in 2012, making it the fifth busiest metro system in Europe and the most-patronised in the world on a per capita basis. The first section of the Prague metro was put into operation in 1974. It was the stretch between stations Kačerov and Florenc on the current line C. The first part of Line A was opened in 1978 (Dejvická – Náměstí Míru), the first part of line B in 1985 (Anděl – Florenc).

In April 2015, construction finished to extend the green line A further into the northwest corner of Prague closer to the airport. A new interchange station for the bus in the direction of the airport is the station Nádraží Veleslavín. The final station of the green line is Nemocnice Motol (Motol Hospital), giving people direct public transportation access to the largest medical facility in the Czech Republic and one of the largest in Europe. A railway connection to the airport is planned.

In operation there are two kinds of units: "81-71M" which is modernized variant of the Soviet Metrovagonmash 81-71 (completely modernized between 1995 and 2003) and new "Metro M1" trains (since 2000), manufactured by consortium consisting of Siemens, ČKD Praha and ADtranz. The minimum interval between two trains is 90 seconds.

The original Soviet vehicles "Ečs" were excluded in 1997, but one vehicle is placed in public transport museum in depot Střešovice. The Náměstí Míru metro station is the deepest station and is equipped with the longest escalator in European Union. The Prague metro is generally considered very safe.

Roads

The main flow of traffic leads through the centre of the city and through inner and outer ring roads (partially in operation).Inner Ring Road (The City Ring "MO"): surrounds central Prague. Called Blanka tunnel complex and part of the City Ring Road, it was estimated to eventually cost (after several increases) CZK 43 billion. Construction started in 2007 and, after repeated delays, the tunnel officially opened in September 2015. This tunnel complex completes a major part of the inner ring road.Outer Ring Road (The Prague Ring "D0"):''' this ring road will connect all major motorways and speedways that meet each other in Prague region and provide faster transit without a necessity to drive through the city. So far , out of a total planned , is in operation. Most recently, the southern part of this road (with a length of more than ) was opened on 22 September 2010. As of 2021, the next  section between Modletice and Běchovice is planned to be completed in 2025.

Rail

The city forms the hub of the Czech railway system, with services to all parts of the country and abroad. The railway system links Prague with major European cities (which can be reached without transfers), including Berlin, Munich, Hamburg, Nuremberg and Dresden (Germany); Vienna, Graz and Linz (Austria); Warsaw, Wrocław and Cracow (Poland); Bratislava and Košice (Slovakia); Budapest (Hungary); Zürich (Switzerland); Split and Rijeka (Croatia, seasonal); Belgrade (Serbia, seasonal) and Moscow (Russia). Travel times range between 2 hours to Dresden and 28 hours to Moscow.

Prague's main international railway station is Hlavní nádraží, rail services are also available from other main stations: Masarykovo nádraží, Holešovice and Smíchov, in addition to suburban stations. Commuter rail services operate under the name Esko Praha, which is part of PID (Prague Integrated Transport).

Air
Prague is served by Václav Havel Airport Prague, the largest airport in the Czech Republic and one of the largest and busiest airports in central and eastern Europe. The airport is the hub of carriers Smartwings and Czech Airlines operating throughout Europe. Other airports in Prague include the city's original airport in the north-eastern district of Kbely, which is serviced by the Czech Air Force, also internationally. It also houses the Prague Aviation Museum. The nearby Letňany Airport is mainly used for private aviation and aeroclub aviation. Another airport in the proximity is Aero Vodochody aircraft factory to the north, used for testing purposes, as well as for aeroclub aviation. There are a few aeroclubs around Prague, such as the Točná airfield.

Cycling

In 2018, 1–2.5 % of people commute by bike in Prague, depending on season. Cycling is very common as a sport or recreation. As of 2021, there are four companies providing bicycle sharing in Prague, none of them is subsidized by the city: Rekola (1,000 bikes), Nextbike (1,000 bikes), Bolt and Lime.

Sport

Prague is the site of many sports events, national stadiums and teams.

Sparta Prague (Czech First League) – football club
Slavia Prague (Czech First League) – football club
Bohemians 1905 (Czech First League) – football club
Dukla Prague (Czech 2nd Football League) – football club
Viktoria Žižkov (Czech 2nd Football League) – football club
HC Sparta Praha (Czech Extraliga) – ice hockey club
HC Slavia Praha (Czech 2nd Hockey League) – ice hockey club
USK Praha (National Basketball League) – basketball club
Prague Lions (European League of Football) –American football 
O2 Arena – the second largest ice hockey arena in Europe. It hosted 2004 and 2015 Ice Hockey World Championship, NHL 2008 and 2010 Opening Game and Euroleague Final Four
Strahov Stadium – the largest stadium in the world
Prague International Marathon
Prague Open – Tennis Tournament held by the I. Czech Lawn Tennis Club
Sparta Prague Open – Tennis Tournament held in Prague 7
Josef Odložil Memorial – Athletics meeting
World Ultimate Club Championships 2010 concluded in Strahov and Eden Arena
Mystic SK8 Cup – World Cup of Skateboarding venue takes place at the Štvanice skatepark
Gutovka – sport area with a large concrete skatepark, the highest outdoor climbing wall in Central Europe, four beach volleyball courts and children's playground, Central European Beach Volleyball Championship 2018 took place here.

International relations

The city of Prague maintains its own EU delegation in Brussels called Prague House.

Prague was the location of U.S. President Barack Obama's speech on 5 April 2009, which led to the New START treaty with Russia, signed in Prague on 8 April 2010.

The annual conference Forum 2000, which was founded by former Czech President Václav Havel, Japanese philanthropist Yōhei Sasakawa, and Nobel Peace Prize laureate Elie Wiesel in 1996, is held in Prague. Its main objective is "to identify the key issues facing civilization and to explore ways to prevent the escalation of conflicts that have religion, culture or ethnicity as their primary components", and also intends to promote democracy in non-democratic countries and to support civil society. Conferences have attracted a number of prominent thinkers, Nobel laureates, former and acting politicians, business leaders and other individuals like: Frederik Willem de Klerk, Bill Clinton, Nicholas Winton, Oscar Arias Sánchez, Dalai Lama, Hans Küng, Shimon Peres and Madeleine Albright.

Twin towns – sister cities

Prague is twinned with:

 Berlin, Germany
 Brussels, Belgium
 Chicago, United States
 Frankfurt am Main, Germany
 Hamburg, Germany
 Kyoto, Japan
 Miami-Dade County, United States
 Nuremberg, Germany
 Phoenix, United States
 Taipei, Taiwan

Namesakes
A number of other settlements are derived or similar to the name of Prague. In many of these cases, Czech emigration has left a number of namesake cities scattered over the globe, with a notable concentration in the New World.

Additionally, Kłodzko is sometimes referred to as "Little Prague". Although now in Poland, it had been traditionally a part of Bohemia until 1763 when it became part of Silesia.

See also

Churches in Prague
List of people from Prague
Outline of the Czech Republic
Outline of Prague
List of museums in Prague

Notes

References

Further reading

Bryant, Chad. Prague: Belonging and the Modern City. Cambridge MA: Harvard University Press, 2021.  
Jekova, Alena. 77 Prague Legends. Prague: Prah, 2006. Prague (Eyewitness Travel Guide by DK Publishing) (2009) excerpt and text search 2006 edition Prague (City Guide) by Neil Wilson (2009) excerpt and text search Praha – Prague and environs (by Čedok) (1926) city guide from 1920sRick Steves' Prague and The Czech Republic by Rick Steves and Honza Vihan (2009) excerpt and text search 
Wilson, Neil. Lonely Planet Prague (2007) excerpt and text search 
Wilson, Paul. Prague: A Traveler's Literary Companion (1995)

Culture and society
Becker, Edwin et al., ed. Prague 1900: Poetry and Ecstasy. (2000). 224 pp.

Burton, Richard D. E. Prague: A Cultural and Literary History. (2003). 268 pp. excerpt and text search 
Cohen, Gary B. The Politics of Ethnic Survival: Germans in Prague, 1861–1914. (1981). 344 pp.
Fucíková, Eliska, ed. Rudolf II and Prague: The Court and the City. (1997). 792 pp.
Holz, Keith. Modern German Art for Thirties Paris, Prague, and London: Resistance and Acquiescence in a Democratic Public Sphere. (2004). 359 pp.
Iggers, Wilma Abeles. Women of Prague: Ethnic Diversity and Social Change from the Eighteenth Century to the Present. (1995). 381 pp. online edition 
Porizka, Lubomir; Hojda, Zdenek; and Pesek, Jirí. The Palaces of Prague. (1995). 216 pp.
SayerDerek. Prague: Crossroads of Europe. London Reaktion Books, 2019. .
Sayer, Derek. Prague, Capital of the Twentieth Century: A Surrealist History (Princeton University Press; 2013) 595 pages; a study of the city as a crossroads for modernity.
Sayer, Derek. "The Language of Nationality and the Nationality of Language: Prague 1780–1920." Past & Present 1996 (153): 164–210. in Jstor 
Spector, Scott. Prague Territories: National Conflict and Cultural Innovation in Kafka's Fin de Siècle. (2000). 331 pp. online edition 
Svácha, Rostislav. The Architecture of New Prague, 1895–1945. (1995). 573 pp.
Wittlich, Peter. Prague: Fin de Siècle.'' (1992). 280 pp.

External links

Tourist website for Prague
Old maps of Prague in Historic Cities site

Prague
880s establishments
Capitals in Europe
Cities and towns in the Czech Republic
Landmarks in the Czech Republic
NUTS 2 statistical regions of the European Union
Populated places established in the 9th century
Regions of the Czech Republic
World Heritage Sites in the Czech Republic